Ñuñoa is a transfer station between the Line 3 and Line 6 of the Santiago Metro. The Line 6 station was opened on 2 November 2017 as part of the inaugural section of the line, between Cerrillos and Los Leones. The Line 3 station was opened on 22 January 2019 as part of the inaugural section of the line, from Los Libertadores to Fernando Castillo Velasco.

It differs from the other stations of the line 6 because some walls are colored yellow or blue, compared to the other stations of the line 6.

In its environment you can find shops, banks, restaurants and supermarkets, thus forming the center of the commune, which gives it its name.

References

Santiago Metro stations
Railway stations opened in 2017
Railway stations opened in 2019
Santiago Metro Line 3
Santiago Metro Line 6